Don't Raise the Bridge, Lower the River is a 1968 British comedy film produced by Walter Shenson and starring Jerry Lewis. It was released on 12 July 1968 by Columbia Pictures and is based on Max Wilk's novel of the same name, with the original Connecticut locale moved to Swinging London and Portugal.

Plot
George Lester is an American living in Britain. His passion is get-rich-quick schemes, and they have caused financial and personal grief for him and his wife, Pamela, who is considering divorce if he continues with them.

Willy Homer is a conman who plans to help George raise some quick cash by selling plans for a drill to a group of Arabs. The plans, which were stolen, are smuggled to Lisbon with help from his accomplice, Fred Davies. As they are about to trade the plans, they realise that they are being double-crossed. A series of chases follows, and eventually the plans are revealed to be worthless to everyone.

Distraught, George finds comfort in his wife and promises to never embark on any more schemes, but Willy shows up at his door with another one.

Cast
 Jerry Lewis as George Lester
 Terry-Thomas as H. William Homer
 Jacqueline Pearce as Pamela Lester
 Bernard Cribbins as Fred Davies
 Patricia Routledge as Lucille Beatty
 Nicholas Parsons as Dudley Heath
 Michael Bates as Dr. Spink
 Colin Gordon as Mr. Hartford
 John Bluthal as Dr. Pinto
 Sandra Caron as Pinto's Nurse
 Margaret Nolan as Spink's Nurse
 Harold Goodwin as Six-Eyes Wiener
 John Barrard as Zebra Man
 Nike Arrighi as Portuguese Waitress
 Al Mancini as Portuguese Chauffeur
 Alexandra Dane as Masseuse
 Molly Peters as Heath's Secretary
 Colin Douglas as Barman
 Francesca Tu as Chinese Telephonist

Production
Filming took place between 15 May and 30 June 1967. The director, Jerry Paris, has a cameo as the umpire at a baseball game.

Home media
The film has been released twice on Region 1 DVD, on 8 July 2003 and again in a Jerry Lewis Triple Feature collection with Three on a Couch and Hook, Line & Sinker on 16 January 2018.

References

External links

 Review of Don't Raise the Bridge, Lower the Water at Jerry-Lewis.info

1968 films
1968 comedy films
British comedy films
Columbia Pictures films
Films based on American novels
Films set in London
Films set in Lisbon
Films directed by Jerry Paris
1968 directorial debut films
1960s English-language films
1960s British films